Augustus Robin was an engraver and the "premier portraitist in New Orleans". His parents were French and he was born in New York City. He worked there, in Philadelphia, and moved to New Orleans in 1838. In New York City he worked for John Chester Buttre.

References

American engravers
Businesspeople from New Orleans
Businesspeople from New York City